Willie Tupou (born 26 October 1985) is a former Tonga international rugby league footballer who played as a second-row forward. He previously played for the Newcastle Knights in the NRL.

Background
Tupou was born in Newcastle, New South Wales, Australia.

He is also the younger brother of NRL star Anthony Tupou.

Career
Tupou has also appeared on several occasions for the Tonga national rugby league team with his most recent international games coming during the 2006 Federation Shield competition.

References

1985 births
Living people
Australian sportspeople of Tongan descent
Australian rugby league players
Rugby league second-rows
Tonga national rugby league team players